Tianjin TEDA may refer to:

 Tianjin TEDA Investment Holding (TEDA Holding), state-owned enterprise based in Tianjin, China 
 Tianjin TEDA F.C., Chinese football club based in Tianjin, a subsidiary of TEDA Holding
 Tianjin TEDA Group a subsidiary of TEDA Holding
 Tianjin TEDA Co. a listed company and subsidiary of TEDA Group

See also
 Tianjin Economic-Technological Development Area